In comedy, a dick joke, penis joke, cock joke or knob joke is a joke that makes a direct or indirect reference to a human penis (known in slang parlance as a dick), also used as an umbrella term for dirty jokes. The famous quote from Mae West, "Is that a gun in your pocket or are you just excited to see me?" (alluding to an erection) is cited as an example of a penis joke. The "dick joke" has been described as "often used as a metaphor for the male-defined nature of stand-up comedy". Dick jokes have also been noted to be both popular and effective with audiences:

In comedy
An important component of a dick joke is breaking a social taboo. As Canadian comedian Ricky Blue puts it, "The trick is being able to speak the unspeakable and somehow get away with it."

Comedian Bill Hicks satirized the popularity of dick jokes in his own act:

However, due to their prurient nature, comedians who rely on explicit humor must find less controversial subject matter if they wish to expand their presence to more restrictive venues like network television and family films. In short, "young professionals whose success has been achieved on the stepladder of dick jokes must eventually change their acts".

An example of a joke of this type relying on an unspoken connotation is:

Because the name Richard can be abbreviated as "Dick", in some jokes a person named "Richard" or "Dick" is presented as a double entendre.

See also
Sex comedy

References

Further reading

 

Joke cycles
Penis
Off-color humor